is a passenger railway station in located in the town of  Kōra,  Shiga Prefecture, Japan, operated by the private railway operator Ohmi Railway.

Lines
Amago Station is served by the Ohmi Railway Main Line, and is located 12.7 rail kilometers from the terminus of the line at Maibara Station.

Station layout
The station consists of a single island platform connected to the station building by a level crossing. The station building also functions as a local community center, but is unattended.

Platform

Adjacent stations

History
Amago Station was opened on June 1, 1911. The station was relocated 100 meters towards Kibukawa in November 2002 and a new station building was completed on November 3, 2003.

Surroundings
Nakasendō
Kōra Municipal Kora Nishi Elementary School

See also
List of railway stations in Japan

References

External links

  Ohmi Railway official site

Railway stations in Shiga Prefecture
Railway stations in Japan opened in 1911
Kora, Shiga